Razzuq Dawood Ghannam  was an Iraqi writer, journalist and newspaper proprietor. He founded the daily newspaper Al-Iraq in June 1920. The newspaper supported the British forces against the Iraqi revolt. It continued until its license was revoked by Nouri Said in 1932.

References

Iraqi journalists
Iraqi political writers
Newspaper publishers (people)
Year of birth missing
Year of death missing
19th-century deaths
20th-century deaths